Navuti Liphongyu (born 18 October 1991) is a Thai cyclist, who most recently rode for UCI Continental team .

Major results
Source: 

2011
 Southeast Asian Games
1st  Team time trial
2nd  Team road race
5th Road race
 5th Overall Tour de Brunei
 8th Overall Tour de East Java
2013
 1st  Road race, National Road Championships
 Southeast Asian Games
2nd  Team time trial
7th Road race
 10th Overall Tour of Thailand
 10th Overall Tour of Fuzhou
2014
 2nd Time trial, National Road Championships
2015
 1st  Time trial, National Road Championships
 6th Road race, Asian Road Championships
 8th Time trial, Southeast Asian Games
2017
 Southeast Asian Games
1st  Road race
2nd  Team time trial
2nd  Team pursuit
 3rd  Team pursuit, Asian Indoor and Martial Arts Games
2018
 3rd  Road race, Asian Games
2019
 Southeast Asian Games
1st  Team road race
1st  Team time trial
2022
 3rd  Road race, Southeast Asian Games

References

External links

1991 births
Living people
Navuti Liphongyu
Cyclists at the 2018 Asian Games
Asian Games medalists in cycling
Navuti Liphongyu
Competitors at the 2019 Southeast Asian Games
Southeast Asian Games medalists in cycling
Navuti Liphongyu
Medalists at the 2018 Asian Games
Competitors at the 2021 Southeast Asian Games
Navuti Liphongyu
Navuti Liphongyu